Anton Burdasov (born 9 May 1991) is a Russian professional ice hockey forward. He is currently playing for Traktor Chelyabinsk of the Kontinental Hockey League (KHL).

Playing career
He first played in the KHL in the 2009–10 season with Traktor Chelyabinsk. At the conclusion of the 2016–17 season, Burdasov was traded by Avangard on the first day of free agency to CSKA Moscow in exchange for Dmitri Kugryshev and Semyon Koshelev on 1 May 2017.

In the following 2017–18 season, Burdasov played in just 12 games with CSKA before he was traded to Salavat Yulaev Ufa in exchange for Denis Kokarev on 26 October 2017.

On 18 September 2019, Burdasov accepted a North American professional tryout with the Edmonton Oilers of the National Hockey League. On 28 September 2019, despite leaving a positive impression, Burdasov was released from his tryout with Edmonton. Returning to Russia, Burdasov agreed to a one-year contract with former club SKA Saint Petersburg on 5 October 2019.

Having played three further seasons with SKA Saint Petersburg, on 7 May 2022, Burdasov returned to his oringinal club, Traktor Chelyabinsk, in agreeing to a three-year contract as a free agent.

Career statistics

Regular season and playoffs

International

Awards and honors

References

External links

1991 births
Living people
Avangard Omsk players
HC CSKA Moscow players
Russian ice hockey left wingers
Salavat Yulaev Ufa players
SKA Saint Petersburg players
Traktor Chelyabinsk players